Mariechen M. Wehselau (May 15, 1906 – July 12, 1992), also known by her married name Mariechen Jackson, was an American competition swimmer, Olympic champion, and world record-holder.

Wehselau represented the United States at the 1924 Summer Olympics in Paris.  She won a gold medal as a member of the winning U.S. team in the 4×100-meter freestyle relay, together with American teammates Euphrasia Donnelly, Gertrude Ederle and Ethel Lackie.  The U.S. relay team set a new world record of 4:58.8 in the event final.  Individually, she also received a silver medal for her second-place performance in the 100-meter freestyle, finishing with a time of 1:12.8, immediately behind American teammate Ethel Lackie.

After the Games Wehselau was invited by the Australian Swimming Association to compete in local championships and perform in exhibitions. She then returned to Hawaii, where from 1928 to 1937 she trained swimmers together with her past coach Dad Center. In 1989 she was inducted into the International Swimming Hall of Fame as an "Honor Pioneer Swimmer".  She died in Honolulu, Hawaii in 1992.

See also
 List of members of the International Swimming Hall of Fame
 List of Olympic medalists in swimming (women)
 World record progression 100 metres freestyle
 World record progression 4 × 100 metres freestyle relay

References

External links
 
 

1906 births
1992 deaths
American female freestyle swimmers
World record setters in swimming
Medalists at the 1924 Summer Olympics
Olympic gold medalists for the United States in swimming
Olympic silver medalists for the United States in swimming
Swimmers from Honolulu
Swimmers at the 1924 Summer Olympics
20th-century American women